Ronny Louis Edmond Coutteure (2 July 1951 – 21 June 2000) was a Belgian actor, director, author, TV presenter and restaurateur and worked in cinema, radio, television, opera and theatre. He was a celebrity in his home country of Belgium and in France but is most famous internationally for his supporting role of Remy Baudouin, comrade-in-arms of Indiana Jones in The Young Indiana Jones Chronicles.

Career
In theater, Ronny Coutteure staged and performed several works. He was the proprietor of the "pub-theatre" La ferme des hirondelles (Swallow Farm) in Fretin in northern France and he wrote and directed an opera, Les Contes d'un buveur de bière (Tales of a beer drinker) as well as teaching "biérologie" ("beer-ology"). Coutteure was a strong supporter of the culture and heritage of northern France and became a symbol of the culture of the frontier region with Belgium.

Death
He committed suicide by hanging on 21 June 2000 at La ferme des hirondelles at the age of 48 shortly after France 3 announced the cancellation of his show Ronny coup de cœur.

Radio / Television
 1998 : Écouteuses, écouteurs, écoutez : Daily show on the Radio Fréquence Nord
 1998-2000 : Ronny coup de cœur : TV Show on the TV Channel France 3 Nord-Pas-de-Calais-Picardie

Filmography

Theatre

Author
 1981 : De Belges histoires
 1992 : D'amoureuses histoires
 1997 : Le temps de la bière
 1997-98 : Lucasfilm magazine

Discography
 1980 : Eul' bibine à Fredo
 1981 : Ils sont fous ces Français
 1983 : Il y a du soleil à Lille
 1984 : Le Roi du smurf
 1989 : Pietje Lamelut et autres histoires
 1994 : Contes d'un buveur de bière

References

External links
 

1951 births
2000 deaths
People from Wervik
Suicides by hanging in France
20th-century Belgian male actors